Hans (in Czech known as Hanuš) Winterberg (23 March 1901 in Prague, Austria-Hungary — 10 March 1991 in Stepperg, Germany) was a Czech-German composer.

Life 

Winterberg began music lessons at the age of nine with the concert pianist Therèse Wallerstein. He went on to study at the Academy of Music and Performing Arts in Prague (Composition with Fidelio F. Finke, and conducting with Alexander Zemlinsky) and at the Prague Conservatory, where he studied with Alois Hába. Gideon Klein was a fellow pupil during the terms of 1939/1940, as it was the case before for several well-known composers like Viktor Ullmann.

Hans Winterberg composed and worked for a good deal of time as vocal coach and repetiteur in Brno as well as for a number of other opera houses and ensembles.
  
He married Maria Maschat, a Roman Catholic, on 3 May 1930. The couple was divorced on 2 December 1944 in accordance to the stipulations of the Third Reich Marriage Laws.

Due to his classification as a Jew, he was interned in Theresienstadt Ghetto on 26 January 1945. On 8. May 1945, he was freed and initially returned to Prague. From there, he composed a number of works until his immigration to Germany in 1947. Hans Winterberg was a Czech citizen and applied for a passport allowing him to travel. In correspondence found at the Ministry for Education addressed to the Foreign Office we read: "The Ministry confirms that the composer Hans Winterberg wishes to travel abroad in order to locate his manuscripts, which due to his internment in Theresienstadt, he sent to various addresses abroad. On behalf of the Ministry, it is advised to allow the applicant the full freedom to travel in all European countries with a valid passport."

He arrived initially in Riederau am Ammersee, before coming to Munich where he worked as an editor at Bavarian Radio and as a music pedagogue at the Richard Strauss Conservatory. He subsequently moved to Bad Tölz where he dedicated himself solely to composition. Despite his many unhappy experiences, he never gave up a belief in universality as a 'Bridge between the West (meaning the German) world and the East'. He saw himself as 'an artist belonging to the group of the unilaterally disadvantaged'. Winterberg was also a painter. Art and music were the two artistic elements that were to define Winterberg right from childhood.  His final years were spent in Stepperg in Upper Bavaria, and he was eventually buried in Tölz, also in Upper Bavaria. Bad Tölz would be the location of his last fruitful years of musical creativity. 
Winterberg was a member of the Artists' Guild of Esslingen.

Works 

Winterberg's compositions are almost exclusively instrumental. He composed orchestral works, a number of chamber and piano solo works; music for radio plays as well as some vocal music. In the course of his creative life, he would be exposed to, and fall under the influence of Wagner and Claude Debussy, as well as the Second Viennese School, the works of Schoenberg, Alexander Zemlinsky, Alois Hába, Béla Bartók, Igor Stravinsky, and perhaps also Paul Hindemith. Some of his music might be seen as a bridge between this later one and Bohuslav Martinů. He was inclined to assimilate and expand in his own manner all of these disparate elements while at the same time, avoiding dodecaphonic compositional techniques.

As a result, he would follow his own stylistic instincts which were noted for their polyrhythmic characteristics. He was an acknowledged master of interweaving and condensing parallel rhythmic structures into a single acoustical sound-idea and effect. His ability to keep to motivic and thematic principals in the development of thematic-melodic ideas should also be noted in addition to his rhythmic and musical vitality. Nevertheless, one can find also a powerful pathos and deep emotional content in many of his slow movements, like it's the case in the Suites (for example in the Piano Suite 1927 or 1945), something remembering a bit similar features in Alban Berg's music. Polytonality in harmony is another side of his stylistic language.

Winterberg largely composed in expanded chromatic tonalities while avoiding both 12 tone and microtonal techniques. 
He referred to his first symphony 'Sinfonia dramatica' as a premonition of the catastrophe of the Second World War when it was first broadcast by Bavarian Radio in a performance conducted Karl List and the Bavarian Philharmonic.
 
Towards the end of 1954, and to great acclaim, the pianist Magda Rusy would perform a number of piano works by Winterberg in recitals in various countries including Austria and Yugoslavia.

Important premieres were his concerto for piano and orchestra performed by the pianist Agi Brand-Setterl on 13 November 1950 and three further premieres, his Sinfonia dramatica 17 January./18. 1949 in Mannheim, his suite for String Orchestra on 12 February 1952 and his Symphonic Epilogue on 13 June 1956 with the Munich Philharmonic, conducted by Fritz Rieger. 
The Winterberg music estate is housed at the Sudeten German Music Archive in Regensburg, though due to contractual conditions laid out upon handover of the estate to the Archive, it remains barred to scholars or musicians until 1 January 2031. This contract was deleted on 17 July 2015.

In November 2018, the first record ever – with chamber music by Hans Winterberg – appeared at Toccata Classics in London.

Breakdown of works

Orchestral music 
 Symphonische Tänze für Orchester: Stimmen der Nacht. Walzer (1935)
 Symphonische Suite für Orchester (1938)
 I. Symphonie (Sinfonia dramatica) (1936)
 II. Symphonie für Orchester (1946/49)
 I. Konzert für Klavier und Orchester (1948)
 II. Konzert für Klavier und Orchester (1950)
 III. Konzert für Klavier und Orchester (1968)
 IV. Konzert für Klavier und Orchester (1972)
 Suite für Streichorchester (1950)
 Symphonischer Epilog für großes Orchester (1952)
 Symphonische Reiseballade für großes Orchester (1958)
 Rhythmophonie 1966/67 für Orchester (1967)
 Symphonisches Rondo für Orchester (1970)
 Stationen 1974/75 (1975)
 Suite für Orchester (unvollendet) (1976)
 Arena – 20. Jahrhundert für Orchester (1979/80)

Ballet 
 Bärenabenteuer – Ballettsuite 1962
 Ballade um Pandora – Ballettmusik für Orchester
 Moor-Mythos – Ballettmusik für Orchester

Chamber music 
 Streichquartett 1936
 Streichquartett 1942
 Streichquartett 1957 / Neufassung 1970
 Streichquartett 1961
 Quartett für 2 Violinen, Viola, Violoncello, Klarinette B 1981
 Trio 1950 für Klarinette in B (Violine), Violoncello, Klavier
 Trio 1960 für Violine, Bratsche und Violoncello
 Suite für Violine und Klavier 1942
 Suite für Klarinette in B und Klavier 1944
 I. Suite für Trompete und Klavier 1945
 II. Suite für Trompete und Klavier 1952
 Suite für Flöte, Oboe, Klarinette, Fagott und Cembalo 1959
 Sudeten-Suite 1964 für Violine, Violoncello und Klavier
 Suite für Bläser 1972
 Rhapsodie für Posaune und Klavier 1951
 Suite für Viola und Klavier 1948
 Sonate für Violine und Klavier 1936
 Sonate für Violoncello und Klavier 1951
 Quintett für Flöte, Oboe, Klarinette, Fagott und Horn 1957
 Quintett für Trompete, Horn, Posaune, Pauke und Klavier 1951

Piano 
 Klaviersonate I 1936
 Klaviersonate II 1941
 Klaviersonate III 1947
 Klaviersonate IV 1948
 Klaviersonate V 1950
 Suite für Klavier 1928
 Suite für Klavier "Theresienstadt 1945"
 Suite für Klavier 1950
 Suite für Klavier 1955
 Suite für Klavier 1956
 Suite für Klavier 1958
 Erinnerungen an Böhmen – Suite für Klavier
 Impressionistische Klaviersuite
 7 neoimpressionistische Stücke im Zwölfton für Klavier
 Vier Intermezzi für Klavier 1929
 Toccata für Klavier 1926
 12 Kinderstücke für Klavier zu zwei und vier Händen 1932
 Bärenabenteuer – Burleske für Klavier 1962
 Drei Klavierstücke 1984/85

Vocal 
 Julian der Gastfreie nach Gustave Flaubert
 Dort und hier – 4 Lieder nach Franz Werfel für Sopran und Klavier
 Sieben Lieder nach Gedichten von Franz Werfel für Sopran und Klavier
 Zwei Lieder nach eigenen Texten für Sopran und Klavier
 Vier Lieder nach Gedichten von Luise.M.Pfeifer-Winterberg für Sopran und Klavier
 Vier Lieder nach Gedichten von Roderich Menzel für Bariton und Klavier
 Kleines Mädchen träumt – 7 Frauenchöre a cappella nach Emanuel Lesehrad (ins Deutsche übertragen von Hans Winterberg)
 Reminiszenzen – Lieder für Gesang und Orchester nach eigenen Texten 1932
 Mondlied eines Mädchens – nach Franz Werfel für Gesang u. Orchester 1933

Radio play 
 Zu "Violetts Träume" von Heinz Kohlhaas
 und "Robinson soll nicht sterben" von F. Forster

Works of light entertainment 
with pseudonym Jan Iweer
 Nymphenburger Fontänen für Orchester
 Russische Rhapsodie für Orchester
 Arietta 1963 für Klavier und Gesang
 Trepak für Klavier
 Erinnerung an Prag für Bariton und Orchester Text: L.M.Pfeifer-Winterberg

Teaching material 
 Musiktheorie

Radio broadcast of Bavarian Radio: 1950–1981 

 Arena 20. Jahrhundert für Sinfonieorchester
Symphonieorchester Graunke (1981),
Leitung: Kurt Graunke
 Ballade um Pandora. Eine choreographische Vision
Münchner Philharmoniker (1959),
Conductor: Rudolf Alberth
 Konzert für Klavier und Orchester
Agi Brand-Setterl (Klavier),
Münchner Philharmoniker (1950),
Dirigent: Fritz Rieger
 Konzert für Klavier und Orchester Nr. 2
Liesel Heidersdorf (Klavier),
Münchner Philharmoniker (1952),
Dirigent: Fritz Rieger
 Konzert für Klavier und Orchester Nr. 3
Gitti Pirner (Klavier),
Münchner Philharmoniker (1970),
Dirigent: Jan Koetsier
 Sinfonie Nr. 1
Populartitel: Sinfonia drammatica,
Münchner Philharmoniker (1955),
Dirigent: Karl List
 Sinfonie Nr. 2 für großes Orchester
Münchner Philharmoniker (1952),
Dirigent: Jan Koetsier
 Stationen 1974/1975
Bamberger Symphoniker (1975),
Dirigent: Rainer Miedel
 Streichquartett
Koeckert Quartett (1951),
Rudolf Koeckert (Violine),
Willi Buchner (Violine),
Oskar Riedl (Viola),
Josef Merz (Violoncello)
 Streichquartett 1957 (Neufassung 1970)
Sonnleitner-Quartett (1971),
Fritz Sonnleitner (Violine),
Ludwig Baier (Violine),
Siegfried Meinecke (Viola),
Fritz Kiskalt (Viloncello)
 Sudetensuite für Violine, Violoncello und Klavier (1966)
Gerhard Seitz (Violine),
Walter Nothas (Violoncello),
Günter Louegk (Klavier)
 Symphonische Reiseballade
Bamberger Symphoniker (1963),
Dirigent: Joseph Strobl
 Symphonischer Epilog
Münchner Philharmoniker (1956),
Dirigent: Fritz Rieger
 Trio für Violine, Viola und Violoncello
Streichtrio (1962),
Angelika Rümann (Violine),
Franz Schessl (Viola),
Wilhelm Schneller (Violoncello)
 4 Lieder für Sopran und Klavier (1973)
Textdichterin: Luise Pfeifer-Winterberg,
Ich ging heute abend,
Leise murmelt der Regen,
Jede Stunde ohne dich,
Wie tobte der Sturm,
Edith Urbanczyk (Sopran),
Hortense Wieser (Klavier)
 Leise murmelt der Regen für Sopran und Klavier (1981)
Textdichterin: Luise Pfeifer-Winterberg,
Irmgard Lampart (Sopran),
Ernst Mauss (Klavier)
 Hörspiel: Robinson soll nicht sterben (1961)
 Hörspiel: Frau Violetts Träume (1960)

Awards 
 1963 Sudetendeutscher Kulturpreis
 1964 Anerkennungspreis zum Johann-Wenzel-Stamitz-Preis

External links 
The Ominous Case of the Hans Winterberg Puzzle
Weitere Bilder von Hans Winterberg aus musikhistorischem Fotomaterial aus der 1. Tschechoslowakischen Republik in den 20er und 30er Jahren
Auszug aus dem Theresienstädter Gedenkbuch in der Zentralen Datenbank der Holocaustopfer
"musica reanimata" Förderverein zur Wiederentdeckung NS-verfolgter Komponisten und ihrer Werke e.V.
"Bohemistik" Arbeitsstelle „Historische Stereotypenforschung" am Institut für Geschichte der Carl von Ossietzky Universität Oldenburg
Neue Musikzeitung – Musik an der Grenze des Lebens, Albrecht Dümling (2015)
Hans Winterberg Family Tree

Sources 
 Die Sudeten-Deutschen, Fritz Peter Habel, Volume 1 – p. 271, Advanced Edition 2002
 Music archive Künstlergilde e.V. Bonn, 29f., Heinrich Simbriger, Letter to Sir Cecil Parott 5 January 1975
 Catalogue of works of contemporary composers from the German eastern territories, Heinrich Simbriger 1955 Supplements
 Klaus Peter Koch. Winterberg, Hans. Sudetendeutsches Musikinstitut (Editor). Lexikon zur Deutschen Musikkultur. Böhmen – Mähren – Sudetenschlesien. Munich 2000. Column 2981–2983.
 Sudetendeutsche Zeitung 14 June 1991
 Sudetendeutscher Kulturalmanach, Editor Josef Heinrich, Delp´sche Verlagsbuchhandlung Munich, Heinrich Simbriger: Composer Hans Winterberg – Recognition Award for music (Composition) 1963
 Historical archive of the Bayerischer Rundfunk (Bavarian Broadcasting Corporation, Munich, Germany)
 100 Years Munich Philharmonic Orchestra – Gabriele E. Meyer 1994

Accompanying literature 
 musica reanimata-Mitteilungen Nr.81 Oktober 2013 – Peter Kreitmeir: Mein Großvater, der Komponist Hans Winterberg
 Biographia Judaica Bohemiae – Rudolf M. Wlaschek 1995
 Juden in Böhmen – Rudolf M. Wlaschek 1990
 Juden im Sudetenland – Ackermann-Gemeinde 2000, S. 236 Rabbiner Löwy Winterberg

References 

1901 births
1991 deaths
20th-century classical composers
20th-century German composers
Czech male classical composers
Czech Jews
Czech classical composers
German male classical composers
German classical composers
Jewish classical composers
20th-century German male musicians